The Aam Aadmi Party (AAP) is a national political party in India. AAP was founded in November 2012 by Arvind Kejriwal and his then-companions, following the 2011 Indian anti-corruption movement.   AAP is currently the governing party in Delhi and Punjab. The party's election symbol is a broom.

The party came into existence following a rift between Kejriwal and Indian activist Anna Hazare regarding the incorporation of electoral politics into the popular 2011 Indian anti-corruption movement, which had been demanding a Jan Lokpal Bill since 2011. Hazare preferred the movement should remain politically unaligned, whereas Kejriwal felt the failure of the agitation route necessitated changes in government's representation itself. Janlokpal was established in Delhi and in Punjab as soon as AAP formed the respective governments with full majority.

Making its electoral debut in the 2013 Delhi Legislative Assembly election, the AAP emerged as second largest party after the BJP; neither of the parties had an absolute majority. Consequently, the AAP formed the government with support from INC members of assembly. Kejriwal became the Chief Minister of Delhi, but his government resigned in 49 days after he could not pass the Jan Lokpal Bill in the assembly, because of the lack of support from the INC. After President's rule in Delhi, in the following 2015 elections, the AAP won 67 of the 70 seats in the assembly, leaving the BJP with just 3 seats and INC with none; and Kejriwal was sworn in as the Chief Minister of Delhi. The AAP lost all seven parliamentary constituencies in Delhi in the 2019 national election. However, the AAP defeated the BJP in the subsequent 2020 Delhi Legislative Assembly election, winning 62 seats.

The AAP cemented its popularity outside Delhi, when it emerged as the second largest party in the 2017 Punjab Legislative Assembly election, securing 20 seats. It went on to win a majority 92 seats in the 2022 Punjab Legislative Assembly election, following which its member Bhagwant Mann was sworn in as the Chief Minister of Punjab. The party has expanded its influence to Chandigarh, Goa and Gujarat, qualifying as a national party.

History

Formation

Massive anti-corruption protests and strikes in 2011 were initiated by a well known social activist Anna Hazare in response to exposure of unprecedented financial scams and corruption by erstwhile UPA government. The aim was to press the government to enact a strong and effective Lokpal (Federal Ombudsman) through a Jan Lokpal Bill. Hazare was supported by a clutch of activists and professionals which became popularly known as Team Anna. Team Anna also included a civil-servant turned activist Arvind Kejriwal. Hazare had wanted to keep the movement politically neutral but Kejriwal considered that direct involvement in politics was necessary because attempts to obtain progress regarding the Jan Lokpal Bill through talks with existing political parties had, in his opinion, achieved nothing. A survey conducted on a Facebook page that purported to be operated by India Against Corruption and other social networking services had indicated that there was wide support for politicisation. Hazare rejected the poll, saying "elections require huge funds, which will be tough for activists to organise without compromising on their values". He also said it would be difficult to ensure that candidates are not corrupted once elected. Hazare and Kejriwal agreed on 19 September 2012 that their differences regarding a role in politics were irreconcilable. Kejriwal had support from some anti-corruption movement activists, such as Prashant Bhushan and Shanti Bhushan, but was opposed by others such as Kiran Bedi and Santosh Hegde. On 2 October, Kejriwal announced that he was forming a political party and that he intended the formal launch to be on 26 November, coinciding with the anniversary of India's adoption of its Constitution in 1949.

The party's name reflects the phrase Aam Aadmi, whose interests Kejriwal proposed to represent. A party constitution was adopted on 24 November 2012, when a National Council comprising 320 people and a National Executive of 23 were also formed. Both the Council and the Executive were expected to have more members in due course, with the intention being that all districts and all classes of people would have a voice. Various committees were proposed to be formed to draft proposals for adoption by the party in a process that was expected to take several months. Although one aim was to limit nepotism, there were complaints at this initial meeting that the selection of people invited to attend was itself an example of such practices. The party was formally launched in Delhi on 26 November and in March 2013, it was registered as a political party by the Election Commission of India.

Funding 
On 26 November 2012, the formal launch day of the AAP, former law minister Shanti Bhushan donated  to the party. Prashant Bhushan, his son, was a member of the party's National Executive Committee. The party raised  by November 2013 and received  in 2015 assembly polls.

Initial period
On 18 May 2013, a group of Indian Americans from 20 different cities in the USA held a convention in Chicago and extended support to the AAP. The convention was attended by two AAP leaders, Kumar Vishwas and Yogendra Yadav, and Kejriwal addressed it via video conferencing. Aruna Roy and Medha Patkar, who had differences with Kejriwal on certain issues, supported him after his 15-day fast against inflated electricity bills.

On 22 March 2014, the Janata Dal (Secular) party of Delhi announced it would merge with the Aam Aadmi Party, citing Kejriwal's tenure as Chief Minister of Delhi.

Two of the founders of the party, Prashant Bhushan and Yogendra Yadav, left the Aam Aadmi Party and formed Swaraj Abhiyan.

Protests 
On 23 March 2013, Kejriwal began an indefinite fast in an attempt to mobilise people against inflated power and electricity bills at a house in Sundar Nagri, a low-income group resettlement colony in North-East Delhi. During the protest, he urged Delhi citizens not to pay "inflated" water and electricity bills. The AAP also demanded an audit of power and electricity supply in Delhi by the Comptroller and Auditor General of India, something that was also supported by civil society groups like the National Alliance of People's Movement (NAPM). The AAP claimed that the protest gathered support from  people in Delhi on a single day and more than  people up to 28 March 2013. Anna Hazare urged Kejriwal to end the fast on 29 March and he did so on 6 April.

On 10 June 2013, Kejriwal supported agitation by Delhi auto rickshaw drivers, who were protesting the Delhi government's ban on advertisements on auto rickshaws. Kejriwal claimed the government's ban was because the drivers supported his party and carried AAP's advertisements on their vehicles. He said that the AAP would put 10,000 advertisements on auto rickshaws as a protest. In retrospect, after Kejriwal had been elected and then resigned his position, a union representing the drivers expressed dissatisfaction, saying: "Arvind Kejriwal, who had won the elections because of the support of the auto drivers, has betrayed them by not fulfilling any of the promises made before the elections".

On 22 April 2015, the AAP organised a rally in Delhi against a land acquisition bill.

Ideology 

At the time of formation, the AAP said that the promise of equality and justice that forms a part of the Constitution of India and of its preamble has not been fulfilled and that the Independence of India has replaced enslavement to an oppressive foreign power with that to a political elite. It claimed that the common people of India remain unheard and unseen except when it suits politicians. The AAP's goal is to reverse the way that government accountability operates, and the party takes an interpretation of the Gandhian socialist concept of swaraj as a tenet. It believes that through swaraj, the government will be directly accountable to the people instead of higher officials. The swaraj model lays stress on self-governance, community building, and decentralization.

Kejriwal has stated that the AAP refuses to be guided by ideologies and that they are entering politics to change the system, saying, "We are aam aadmis. If we find our solution in the left, we are happy to borrow it from there. If we find our solution in the right, we are happy to borrow it from there." Kejriwal has put forward 3 pillars of Aam Aadmi Party's core ideology: staunch patriotism, staunch honesty and humanity.

The party advocates scrapping Section 377 of the Indian Penal Code and legalizing both homosexuality and same-sex marriage. The party is also regarded as being populist, and centrist.

During AAP government's tenure, Delhi has replaced Bengaluru as the start-up capital of India. The AAP government has facilitated various start-up policies in Delhi from time to time during its tenure.

Organisation
The party leadership consists of the following bodies:

National Convener: Arvind Kejriwal

National Secretary: Pankaj Gupta

National Treasurer: Narain Dass Gupta

Political Affairs Committee 
Political Affairs Committee is the highest decision-making body of the party. The current member of the PAC are   Arvind Kejriwal, Manish Sisodia, Sanjay Singh, Gopal Rai, Atishi, Imran Hussain, Durgesh Pathak, Raghav Chadha and Rakhi Bidlan. Pankaj Kr Gupta (National Secretary) and Narain Dass Gupta (National Treasurer) are the ex officio members of the PAC.

National Executive Committee 
The party's National Executive Committee had 34 members in 2022.

State Leadership
The state leadership of the party manages the state wings.

Electoral performance

General election results

State assembly elections

Municipal corporation election results

Delhi Assembly election, 2013 

The 2013 Delhi state assembly elections were the party's first electoral contest. The Election Commission approved the symbol of a broom for use by the AAP in that campaign. The party said that its candidates were honest and had been screened for potential criminal backgrounds. It published its central manifesto on 20 November 2013, promising to implement the Jan Lokpal Bill within 15 days of coming to power.

In November 2013, a sting operation conducted by Media Sarkar alleged that several leaders of the AAP, including Kumar Vishwas and Shazia Ilmi, had agreed to extend their support to some people seeking assistance with land deals and other financial arrangements in return for donations in cash to the AAP. Ilmi offered to withdraw her candidature as a result, but the party refused to accept her offer, describing the footage as fabricated and a violation of the Model Code of Conduct. The Election Commission ordered an inquiry regarding the legitimacy of the video.

The AAP emerged as the second-largest party in Delhi, winning 28 of the 70 Assembly seats; the Bharatiya Janata Party, as the largest party, won 31, while its ally Shiromani Akali Dal, won 1; Indian National Congress won 8, and two were won by others. On 28 December 2013, the AAP formed a minority government in the hung Assembly, with what Sheila Dikshit describes as "not unconditional" support from Indian National Congress. Kejriwal became the second-youngest Chief Minister of Delhi. As a result of the Delhi elections, the AAP became a recognised state party in Delhi.

General election, 2014 
The AAP fielded 434 candidates in the 2014 Indian general election, in which it did not expect to do well. It recognised that its support was based primarily in urban areas and that different strategies might be required for different regions of the country. The party pointed out that its funding was limited and that there were too many demands for local visits from Kejriwal. The intention was to field candidates in large numbers to maximise the likelihood of recognition as a national party by the Election Commission. The outcome was that four AAP candidates won, all from Punjab. Consequently, the AAP became a recognised state party in Punjab. The party obtained 2% of all votes cast nationwide and 414 of its candidates forfeited their deposit by failing to secure one-sixth of the vote in their constituencies. Although the party secured 32.9 per cent of the votes in Delhi, it failed to win any seats there.

AAP convenor, Arvind Kejriwal fought from Varanasi against BJP's Prime Ministerial candidate Narendra Modi, but lost by a margin of 371,784 (20.30%) votes and came second ahead of BSP, Congress, SP.

Immediately after the elections, Shazia Ilmi (PAC member) resigned from the party. The National Executive member Yogendra Yadav in a letter to his party members criticised  Kejriwal's style of leadership.

After the National Executive meeting on 8 June, the party and Kejriwal acknowledged these differences and announced the launch of "Mission Vistar" (Mission Expand), to include more people in local as well as national decision making.

Delhi Assembly election, 2015 

The Delhi state assembly elections for the Sixth Legislative Assembly of Delhi were held on 7 February 2015, as declared by the Election Commission of India. The Aam Aadmi Party scored a landslide victory by winning a majority of 67 of the 70 seats. The BJP was able to win 3 seats and the Congress party saw all its candidates lose. Kejriwal became the Chief Minister for the second time. The AAP had started campaigning in Delhi in November 2014 and declared candidates for all 70 seats.

During the campaign, Kejriwal claimed that the BJP had been trying to bribe AAP volunteers. He asked Delhi voters to not deny the bribes offered to them. He suggested that voters should accept the bribe from others and yet vote for AAP through the secret ballot in the election. The situation caused the Election Commission of India to instruct Kejriwal to desist from breaking laws governing the model code of conduct for elections in India, but the Delhi court then allowed Kejriwal to challenge this.

The President's Rule was subsequently rescinded and Kejriwal became the Chief Minister of Delhi with six cabinet ministers (Manish Sisodia, Asim Ahmed Khan, Sandeep Kumar, Satyendar Jain, Gopal Rai, and Jitender Singh Tomar).

Major differences surfaced within the party leadership soon after its victory. It created deep fissures between the founding members who had together championed the anti-corruption movement. Problems emerged in February 2015 when Yogendra Yadav and Prashanth Bhushan wrote a joint letter to the National Executive, highlighting Kejriwal's tendency to unilateral decision-making, which they alleged had compromised the party's core principle of Swaraj. After continued allegations, counter-allegations and several failed attempts at reconciliation between the two sides, Yadav and Bhushan were first removed from the PAC and later from the National Executive after the party's National Council passed a resolution to expel them for their alleged anti-party activities. Party leaders refuted accusations made by Yadav and Bhushan at the meeting that the party was murdering democracy and resorting to intimidation. In April 2015, Yadav, Bhushan, Anand Kumar, and Ajit Jha were removed from the party.

Assembly elections, 2017 
For the first time, the AAP contested the 2017 Goa Legislative Assembly election and 2017 Punjab Legislative Assembly election. In Goa the AAP could not win any seat, and 38 out of 39 candidates failed to save their security deposits.

For the 2017 Punjab Legislative Assembly election, the Lok Insaaf Party allied with the AAP. This alliance was called the AAP Alliance and was represented on news channels as AAP+. It won 22 seats in total, two of which were won by the Lok Insaaf Party and the other twenty by the AAP.

General election, 2019 

Unlike the 2014 Indian general election, the Political Affairs Committee (PAC) of the party decided to contest elections on limited seats of some of the states and all the seats in Delhi, Goa, and Punjab. In the state of Haryana, the AAP formed an alliance with Dushyant Chautala's Jannayak Janata Party to contest three Lok Sabha constituencies. The PAC also decided to support and campaign for CPI (M) in Kerala. The party also fielded its first transgender candidate from Allahabad in Uttar Pradesh. The AAP won only 1 constituency of Sangrur

Delhi Assembly election, 2020 

Voting for the Delhi Assembly elections took place on 8 February 2020, following vehement campaigns run by the major political parties contesting the election. The counting of votes and subsequent announcement of results happened on 11 February.

The Aam Aadmi Party retained the government as the party won 62 out of 70 seats. Arvind Kejriwal became the Chief Minister of Delhi for the third consecutive time. The party's vote share was 53.5%, according to the results.

2021 Chandigarh elections
The AAP contested in 2021 Chandigarh Municipal Corporation election for the first time,  won 14 seats and became the single largest party in the council of total 35 elected seats. Sitting mayor Ravi Kant Sharma from BJP lost his seat to AAP candidate Damanpreet Singh. In ward number 21, former mayor and BJP candidate Davesh Moudgil was defeated by AAP's Jasbir.

Assembly elections in 2022 

In January 2021, Arvind Kejriwal announced that AAP would be contesting six state elections in 2022. The six states were Uttar Pradesh, Himachal Pradesh, Goa, Gujarat, Uttarakhand, and Punjab. The party won a landslide victory in Punjab, defeating the incumbent Congress government of Charanjit Singh Channi, and state party convener Bhagwant Mann was sworn in as the new CM. The party also gained two seats in Goa and five seats in Gujarat .

Current leaders in Houses

Government of Delhi

2013–2014 
After coming to power in Delhi, Arvind Kejriwal announced a reduction in electricity bills for up to 400 units, driven by subsidy. He also ordered an audit of power distribution companies. The AAP government also announced that homes with metered connections would receive 20 kilolitres of free water per month, but would have to pay 10% more if they exceeded that limit. The government scrapped the Foreign Direct Investment in multibrand retail. It established an anti-graft helpline for citizens to report corrupt officials.

The government's plan to conduct Janata Durbars (public hearings with ministers) was abandoned due to mismanagement. Vinod Kumar Binny, an AAP Member of the Legislative Assembly, was expelled after rebelling against the party.

On 20 January 2014, Kejriwal and his ministers staged protests at Rail Bhavan against the Union Government Home Ministry. These came after his Law Minister, Somnath Bharti, had been dissatisfied with the response from the Delhi police to allegations relating to a neighborhood popular with immigrants from Uganda and Nigeria. Kejriwal demanded that the police should come under direct control of the Delhi government and that officers who had refused to do as Bharti had requested should be suspended. He said that the protest would not hamper his work as he had brought along files and would carry on working from the venue of the protest. He later claimed that it was the first time in Indian political history that a Chief Minister had protested on the streets to raise his government's demands for a fair inquiry. After two days, he ended his fast when the Lieutenant Governor, Najeeb Jung, intervened by suspending two police officers involved and set up a judicial inquiry.

Also in January 2014, the party's office in Ghaziabad was attacked by right-wing activists protesting against Prashant Bhushan, who had expressed a personal opinion against the Armed Forces (Special Powers) Act in Jammu & Kashmir by mentioning a referendum in that state to decide whether the people wanted the army to handle internal security. This caused the AAP to determine that its prominent members would in future refrain from expressing opinions on anything that was not agreed upon by a broad consensus within the party.

By January 2014, financial support for the party from non-resident Indians had halved during the party's period in government, possibly reflecting disenchantment. The party also admitted that its systems may have significantly overstated members introduced through a nationwide recruitment campaign that was affected by hoaxers.

In February 2014, the AAP tried to introduce a Jan Lokpal Bill in the Delhi Assembly. However, Jung said that the AAP government tabling the bill without his agreement would be "unconstitutional" because the correct procedures for introduction had not been followed. This view was supported by Congress and the BJP, and Jung advised the Assembly Speaker not to allow the tabling. The AAP government stated that it was following all the procedures and there was no need to obtain prior approval from the centre or Lieutenant Governor to table the bill. When the BJP and INC blocked the introduction of the bill, the AAP government resigned and Delhi was placed under President's rule instead. Kejriwal alleged that there was a nexus among Congress, the BJP, and the industrialist Mukesh Ambani, and that the two parties had "ganged up" against the AAP after it filed a First Information Report against Ambani. In March, the party declared that it would seek re-election.

2015–present

Education 
In December 2015, the AAP asked all private schools to make their own criteria for making the admission process transparent by uploading the criteria on the school website. In a follow-up move in early 2016, the AAP government scrapped all admission quotas from private schools except for children from extremely weak socioeconomic backgrounds. In 2015, Advocate Prashant Patel challenged a decision by Arvind Kejriwal, who had appointed 21 AAP MLAs as Parliamentary Secretaries to seven ministries.

In 2016, the AAP government launched a campaign to focus on the reading ability of students after it found that 3.5 lakh students in grades 6–8 could not read. It ran a two-month "crash course", which it claimed led to 1 lakh such students now being able to read their textbooks.

The government also formed a panel to investigate the finances of schools in Delhi. The panel scrutinised a total of 1,108 private unaided schools, and identified some as having overcharged parents on the pretext of implementing recommendations of the Sixth Pay Commission. The government ordered these schools to return the excess fee back to the students' parents, failing which it threatened to take over the institutions. The announcement received mixed responses: some perceived it as a justified attack on financial malpractice and unjustified fee hikes, while the Delhi High Court was of the opinion that the government should stop meddling in private school affairs.

In October 2017, the AAP government announced that it would inaugurate over 5,000 new classrooms in more than 100 Delhi government schools.

The government also allocated the highest share of the Delhi state budget towards education for five years in a row. However, since November 2020, the Delhi government was unable to pay teacher's salaries due to lack of funds. In April 2022, the Delhi HC questioned the government regarding the non payment of salaries to 1500 teachers and 2000 staff members who had approached the court for payment of their dues.

Health 
The AAP government had planned to set up 1,000 Mohalla Clinics by the end of 2017 to provide consultations, medicine, and tests free of cost to patients. In February 2017, it was reported that 110 such clinics were functional and had treated over 8 lakh patients in five months. The program was commended by former UN General Secretary Kofi Annan and former Prime Minister of Norway and Director-General of the World Health Organization, Gro Harlem Brundtland, as an excellent strategy for building a universal healthcare system.

Shunglu Committee 

In 2016, former Lieutenant Governor of Delhi Najeeb Jung ordered a committee formed to examine alleged irregularities and cases of nepotism across Delhi State Government departments.

Other state wings
The AAP has state wings in Haryana, Uttarakhand, Uttar Pradesh, Gujarat, Goa, Madhya Pradesh, Bihar, Rajasthan, West Bengal, Karnataka, Maharashtra, Jharkhand, Chhattisgarh, Odisa, Kerala, Tamil Nadu, Puducherry, Andhra Pradesh, Telangana, Jammu and Kashmir, Assam, and Manipur.

Bihar
The party supported Nitish Kumar's Janata Dal (United) in the 2015 Bihar Legislative Assembly election against the Bharatiya Janata Party.

Chandigarh
In 2021, the AAP contested in the Chandigarh Municipal Corporation election for the first time, won 14 seats and became the single largest party in the council of total 35 elected seats. A former mayor from BJP and another sitting mayor of Chandigarh Municipal Corporation from BJP lost their seats to AAP candidates Jasbir and Damanpreet Singh.

Goa
In January 2021 Arvind Kejriwal announced that AAP would be contesting in 2022 Goa Legislative Assembly election. Arvind Kejriwal gave Guarantees for Goans in his poll campaign based on development and positivity:
Jobs for Goans
1 job per family for unemployed, or ₹3000/month until then
80% private jobs reserved for Goans
₹5000/month for unemployed in tourism due to COVID
₹5000/month for those affected by mining ban
Skill University
Free pilgrimage across religions

The AAP decided to carry out every project with citizen's consent. The AAP has also promised to increase the remuneration provided to women in Goa under a state-sponsored scheme and also promised financial assistance to women not covered under it. The AAP gave a CM candidate for Goans. Amit Palekar was made the CM face by the AAP.

In Goa the AAP won 2 seats & 6% vote share in the 2022 Goa Legislative Assembly Election.

Gujarat
Aam Aadmi Party Gujarat or AAP Gujarat is the Gujarat state wing of Aam Aadmi Party. The AAP office is located in Navrangpura, Ahmedabad. AAP had participated in the 2017 Gujarat Legislative Assembly election, the 2021 Gujarat local elections and the 2022 Gujarat Legislative Assembly election. It has 64 elected members in the ward councils of Gandhinagar Municipal Corporation, Surat Municipal Corporation and other urban and rural local bodies in Gujarat.

In January 2021, Arvind Kejriwal announced that AAP would be contesting the 2022 Gujarat Legislative Assembly election. Gulab Singh Yadav, Delhi MLA is the incharge of the party for the 2022 Gujarat election. Isudan Gadhvi was announced as AAP's Chief Minister candidate for the election by Arvind Kejriwal on 4 November 2022. The party won five seats in that election.

Manifesto for 2022 assembly elections

Jammu and Kashmir 
On 8 April 2022, several prominent leaders from Jammu and Kashmir joined AAP, including Balwant Singh Mankotia, and former minister Yash Paul Kundal, with the AAP leadership stating they would contest all 90 seats in the upcoming Jammu and Kashmir elections, expected to take place in 2022.

Haryana
For the 2019 Indian general election, the AAP declared a coalition with the Jannayak Janata Party in Haryana. Of the total 10 seats, JJP contested on seven seats and the AAP contested three seats. Both parties failed to win any seat.

The AAP continued its coalition with JJP in the 2019 Haryana Legislative Assembly election. The AAP did not win any seat after which it ended the coalition. JJP won 10 seat and joined the BJP government under CM Khattar.

Himachal Pradesh
In October 2016, half of the members of Himachal Lokhit Party joined Aam Aadmi Party. AAP leadership decided to not contest the 2017 Himachal Pradesh Legislative Assembly election.

In January 2021, Arvind Kejriwal announced that AAP would be contesting in 2022 Himachal Pradesh Legislative Assembly election. On 6 April 2022, the AAP held a roadshow in Mandi with Kejriwal and Punjab Chief Minister Bhagwant Mann. In April 2022, several political leaders from different political parties joined AAP. Surjeet Singh Thakur was appointed as President of the state unit in June 2022.

Manifesto for 2022 assembly elections
AAP guarantees in the 2022 Himachal Pradesh election:

Karnataka
AAP reconstituted the state unit less than a fortnight after the party dissolved its previous office bearers.The party intends to contest all 224 seats in the 2023 Karnataka legislative assembly election.
On 4th of March, 2023, Kejriwal and Bhagwant Mann kickstarted the election campaign in Davanagere, where they administered oath to party workers.

Kerala
On May 15 of 2022, Kejriwal announced the formation of People's Welfare Alliance along with Twenty20 party ahead of Thrikkakkara assembly by-election.

The party's social media handles proclaimed on 23rd January 2023 that the state unit has been dissolved and that new office bearers will be announced soon.

Madhya Pradesh
In July 2022, AAP debuted in Madhya Pradesh by winning the election for the Mayor of Singrauli Municipal Corporation and five wards in the 2022 Madhya Pradesh local elections.

Maharashtra
In January 2023, party leader Gopal Italia said that AAP will contest all small, big polls in Maharashtra.State Unit chief Preeti Sharma Menon announced that the party will fight the BMC election 
with all its strength.

Punjab

In December 2015, Aam Aadmi Party declared that it would contest the Legislative Assembly elections in 2017. The AAP which did not participate in the previous assembly election, had fought 2014 Lok Sabha elections. Their 2014 performance translates to 33 assembly seats out of 117. In the 2017 Punjab assembly election, the party formed a coalition with the Lok Insaaf Party and gave it five seats. No CM candidate was declared before the elections. The AAP won 20 seats in the Punjab Assembly in its debut in the 2017 Punjab elections. In March 2018, the Lok Insaaf Party broke the coalition due to differences.

In January 2021 Arvind Kejriwal announced that AAP would be contesting in 2022 Punjab Legislative Assembly election. Raghav Chadha was appointed AAP Punjab co-in-charge for the Punjab election. On 18 January 2022 Bhagwant Mann was chosen as AAP's candidate for the post of Chief Minister of Punjab for the 2022 Punjab Legislative Assembly election. The selection was done by polling from the public.

In March 2021, Delhi CM Arvind Kejriwal held a Kisaan Mahapanchayat at Bagha Purana in Moga district and began campaigning for elections. On 28 June 2021, Kejriwal announced in a speech in Chandigarh that 300 units of free electricity would be provided to all Punjabis if the party wins the election. On 30 September 2021, Kejriwal also announced that if AAP wins the election, his government would build Mohalla Clinics in Punjab that would provide free healthcare facilities. On 22 November 2021, Arvind Kejriwal announced that if AAP wins Punjab then 1,000 rupees will be given to every women above 18 years of age.

Uttarakhand
In January 2021 Arvind Kejriwal announced that AAP would be contesting in 2022 Uttarakhand Legislative Assembly election. 
On 17 August 2021, the AAP declared their Chief Ministerial candidate for the assembly election. AAP contested on 70 seats but did not win any in 2022 election.

Uttar Pradesh
The Aam Aadmi Party gave its support to activist Begum Tabassum Hasan in the Kairana bypoll election in May 2018 stating that AAP will support anti-BJP candidates.

The AAP had contested in the 2021 UP Panchayat Elections, and won 64 seats.

In January 2021 Arvind Kejriwal announced that the AAP would be contesting in 2022 Uttar Pradesh Legislative Assembly election. AAP Rajya Sabha MP Sanjay Singh said that the AAP will contest on all 403 assembly seats in the election. He said, "In the first list, there are eight candidates who have completed MBA. Apart from this, there are 38 postgraduates, four doctors, eight who have done PhD, seven engineers and 39 graduates. Eight women have been given tickets in the first list." Contesting in the UP state election for the first time, the AAP did not win any seat, it received 3,47,192 votes in the state, with a vote share of 0.38% of the total votes polled.

Documentary
An Insignificant Man is a 2017 Hindi/English Indian socio-political documentary co-produced and directed by Khushboo Ranka and Vinay Shukla and also co-produced by filmmaker Anand Gandhi. The documentary is about the rise of anti-corruption protests in India and the formation and rise to power of the Aam Aadmi Party.

See also 
 AAP Punjab
 Swaraj (book)
 List of political parties in India

Notes and references

Notes

Citations

Sources

External links 

 
 Aam Aadmi Party (AAP) at Elections.in

Further reading 

 

Aam Aadmi Party
Political parties established in 2012
2012 establishments in India
Socialist parties
Socialist parties in India
Nationalist parties
Nationalist parties in India
Populist parties